The NHL lockout may refer to any of the four labour actions in the history of the National Hockey League:
 The 1992 NHL strike, which postponed 30 games of the 1991–92 season 
 The 1994–95 NHL lockout, which cancelled many of the games of the 1994–95 season, including the All-Star Game and shortened the regular season to 48 games per team with no inter-conference games
 The 2004–05 NHL lockout, which cancelled all of the games of the 2004–05 season
 The 2012–13 NHL lockout, which cancelled many of the games of the 2012–13 season, including the All-Star Game and shortened the regular season to 48 games per team with no inter-conference games

See also
MLB lockout
MLS lockout
NBA lockout
NFL lockout

Sports labor disputes in the United States
National Hockey League labor relations
Ice hockey controversies